are figures of speech used in Japanese  poetry in association with certain words. The set phrase can be thought of as a "pillow" for the noun or verb it describes, although the actual etymology is not fully known. It can also describe associations and allusions to older poems (see ).

Many have lost their original meaning but are still used.

History and usage 

In terms of usage,  are often used at the beginning of a poem. The  is a similar figure of speech used in  poetry, used to introduce a poem. In fact, the 17th-century Buddhist priest and scholar Keichū wrote that "if one says , one speaks of long " in his . Japanese scholar Shinobu Orikuchi also echoes this statement, claiming that  are  that have been compressed.

While some  still have meanings that add to the meaning of the following word, many others have lost their meanings. As  became standardized and used as a way to follow Japanese poetic traditions, many were used only as decorative phrases in poems and not for their meanings. It is said that Sei Shōnagon often used this technique in The Pillow Book, and some earlier scholars thought that they were named after the book, but most agree now that the practice was fairly common at the time she wrote the Pillow Book.

Examples 

The very first poem demonstrates how this was used:

In this poem,  (literally "sky-seen" or "sky-spreading") modifies the place name Yamato.

Some historical  have developed into the usual words for their meaning in modern Japanese, replacing the terms they originally alluded to. In modern Japanese,  has displaced the latter word outright and become the everyday word for "chicken" (dropping the case marker  along the way).

Some more  are listed below:

See also
 
 
 Onomatopoeia
 The Pillow Book

Notes

References

Additional sources

External links
  on wakapoetry.net

Japanese poetry
Japanese literary terminology
Articles containing Japanese poems
Japanese words and phrases